Michael Murphy (b. Kilmichael, County Cork 18 February 1924; d. Cork 7 October 1996) was an Irish Catholic bishop in the last quarter of the 20th Century.

Before becoming a priest Murphy was a member of the team that won the 1941 All-Ireland Minor Hurling Championship. Murphy was ordained priest on 19 June 1949. He served in Peru then as head teacher of St Finbarr's College, Farranferris. He was appointed Coadjutor Bishop of Cork and Ross on 1 April 1976 and was consecrated its diocesan on 23 August 1980. He died in post sixteen years later.

References

1924 births
1996 deaths
Alumni of St Patrick's College, Maynooth
Alumni of University College Dublin
Glen Rovers hurlers
Cork inter-county hurlers
Irish expatriates in Peru
Roman Catholic bishops of Cork and Ross
20th-century Roman Catholic bishops in Ireland